Caratinga is a municipality in eastern Minas Gerais state, Brazil. The population in 2020 was 92,603 inhabitants and the total area of the municipality was 1,251 km2. The elevation is 578 meters above sea level, with maximum elevation of 1,516 m in the Serra do Rio Preto and  330 m at the mouth of the Córrego Boachá.

Location
The municipality is located at 19° 37’ 30’’ latitude south and at 42° 09’ 00’’ longitude west. It is part of Region VIII, denominated Rio Doce, and part of the microregion of Mata de Caratinga, in the eastern part of Minas Gerais.

It lies on the important Rio-Bahia interstate highway (BR 116) and is connected to the state capital of Belo Horizonte by BR–381 to the city of  João Monlevade. After João Monlevade there is a federal highway, BR 262, which leads into the capital.  The state capital lies at a distance of 320 km.  The nearest airport is in Ubaporanga 
15 km from downtown, tarmacked runway 1200 m long and 20 m wide.

The main rivers that cross the municipality are the Caratinga River and its tributary Laje, the Manhuaçu and the Preto.

Etymology
"Caratinga" is the synonym of cará,  and comes from the Tupi term aka'ratin'ga, which means "white cará". The city's name refers to the abundance of this particular tuber in the area since it was inhabited by the Aimoré people.

Climate
The climate is tropical sub-hot, with mild summer temperatures and winter temperatures between 15 and 18 °C.   The average temperature is around  23 °C, while the maximum and the minimum are 28 °C and 17 °C respectively.  In the summer season the concentration of rains is over 70% of the total annual rainfall, which is about 1.140 mm.

Economy
Caratinga is essentially agricultural. A large part of the landholdings (77%) are minifundios—small properties.  The main crops are fruits and vegetables (1000 producers) but especially coffee. With an area planted with 66 million trees in more than 320 square kilometres, coffee growing provides about 8 thousand direct jobs and 35 thousand indirect.  The harvest is from April to September.

Education and Culture
There are two institutions of higher education: UNEC - Centro Universitário de Caratinga  and  FIC - Faculdades Integradas de Caratinga .

There are three local newspapers: O Jornal de Caratinga (weekly), A Semana (weekly), and  Diário de Caratinga (daily).

Tourism
Declared a national historical monument, Pedra Itaúna, with its 1,012 meters elevation, attracts participants in rappel, paragliding, and mountain climbing.

Some 150 northern muriquis (Brachyteles arachnoids) live today at the Fazenda Montes Claros, near Caratinga. It is one of their last refuges. The muriqui is the largest monkey of the Americas and one of the most endangered primates of the world.  Specialists cite the biological importance of the Fazenda Montes Claros, where three other primate species live along with the muriqui: the buffy headed marmoset, the black-capped capuchin and the brown howler monkey.

Transportation
The city is served by Ubaporanga Airport, located in the adjoining municipality of Ubaporanga.

References

External links

Official site (in Portuguese)
Current photos of Caratinga (in Portuguese) 
Old photos of Caratinga (in Portuguese)
Song official symbols

Municipalities in Minas Gerais